The 1984 Louisiana Tech Bulldogs football team was an American football team that represented Louisiana Tech University as a member of the Southland Conference during the 1984 NCAA Division I-AA football season. In their second year under head coach A. L. Williams, the team compiled a 10–5 record and finished as Southland Conference champion and NCAA Division I-AA Runner-Up.

Schedule

References

Louisiana Tech
Southland Conference football champion seasons
Louisiana Tech Bulldogs football seasons
Louisiana Tech Bulldogs football